Pfeifer is an unincorporated community in Freedom Township, Ellis County, Kansas, United States.

History
Volga German immigrants founded Pfeifer in August 1876, naming it after the village they had emigrated from in Russia. The final group of Volga German immigrants arrived from the community of Kamenka in June 1878. In 1884, the settlement moved to its current location. A post office opened in Pfeifer in 1887.

Beginning in 1879, local residents constructed a series of church buildings that culminated in the completion of Holy Cross Church in May 1918.

Geography
Pfeifer is located at  (38.7080679, -99.1656536) at an elevation of 1,880 feet (571 m).

Pfeifer lies on the south side of the Smoky Hill River in the Smoky Hills region of the Great Plains.

Transportation
Saratov Street, a paved county road, runs north–south through Pfeifer. Northeast of the community, it becomes Pfeifer Avenue, connecting Pfeifer with Victoria  to the north.

Notable people

Notable individuals who were born in and/or have lived in Pfeifer include:
 Monty Basgall (1922-2005), Major League Baseball 2nd baseman, coach

References

Further reading

External links
 Ellis County maps: Current, Historic, KDOT

Unincorporated communities in Ellis County, Kansas
Unincorporated communities in Kansas